Lincoln Park School, also known as Lincoln Park Elementary School and Greenfield High School, is a historic school building located at Greenfield, Hancock County, Indiana.  It was built in 1926, and is a three-story, Classical Revival style brick building. The front facade features a projecting entrance portico. Also on the property is a contributing gymnasium constructed in 1927.

It was listed on the National Register of Historic Places in 2009.

References

School buildings on the National Register of Historic Places in Indiana
Neoclassical architecture in Indiana
School buildings completed in 1926
Schools in Hancock County, Indiana
National Register of Historic Places in Hancock County, Indiana
1926 establishments in Indiana